Nagraj is a superhero appearing in Indian comic books published by Raj Comics created in the late 1980s by Rajkumar Gupta. Nagraj first appeared in the comics Nagraj GENL #14 which was written by Parshuram Sharma  and illustrated by Pratap Mullick.
After that Sanjay Ashtpure, Pratap Mullick, Chandu, Milind Misal and Vitthal Kamble alternately illustrated the character for 44 issues, ending in 1995 with Visarpi Ki Shadi.

Nagraj is believed to have been inspired by the mythological Ichchhadhari Nag (shapeshifting snakes) and historical Vishmanushya (venomous human). His stories create a rich blend of mythology, fantasy, magic, and science fiction. Many of Nagraj's fans believe that, over time, Nagraj's comics have developed snake mythology of its own, which is unique to the popular Indian beliefs about snakes that are prevalent among the masses.

In the middle of the nineties Anupam Sinha (who was already running the mega-successful Dhruv series) took over the helms of Nagraj as well. Anupam Sinha's expansive narration could not completely fit in a single comic, so he used multi-comic stories to layer and enrich his tales. The Khajana arc by Anupam Sinha set up the backstory beautifully, and discredited Nagmani many years after the comics began.  He also led to increase in frequency of Two-in-One comics, which combined Nagraj and Dhruv and started happening once in a year. Nagraj has changed a lot in his 25 years in print, both in terms of looks as well as powers and abilities. With time many new artists such as Lalit Sharma and Hemant Kumar have done illustration of Nagraj.

Fictional character biography 

In ancient times, there existed a kingdom known as Takshaknagar, ruled by King Takshakraj and Queen Lalita who had no children. The absence of a prince or princess made Nagpasha, the younger brother of the King Takshakraj the only potential heir to the throne.

One day when the queen was going to pray to Deva Kaljayi, Nagpasha replaced the curtained plate of her offerings to the god with one containing a dead mongoose. The Snake God got angry and knocked her unconscious with his venomous breath.  When the child was born, everyone believed him dead because his whole body was blue and showed no signs of life.

As per Hindu rituals, the newborn baby was thrown into the river. Meanwhile, the snake deity Deva Kaljayi appeared in the dreams of King Maniraj and his wife Queen Manika, rulers of ageless Ichchhadhaari nags, living secretly on an invisible island in the Indian Ocean called Nagdweep. He told them the location of the baby and asked them to cure him. Many years passed and the treatment started showing results and, although still in the suspended animation, the colour of the baby had gradually changed to green.

Later Vishandhar, an evil Tantrik placed him back into the same bushes in the river where he was found. A priest of the nearby temple located him and gave him to Professor Nagmani, who was wandering in the nearby forest searching for snakes. The child had extraordinary healing powers and was extremely venomous. He raised the baby, who became Nagraj.

In his debut issue, Nagraj was unleashed as an international terror weapon by the evil scientist Professor Nagmani. Nagraj, in this first mission, was tasked with stealing a golden statue of a Goddess from a temple that was protected by tribal devotees, snakes, and by a mysterious 300-year-old Sadhu named Baba Gorakhnath. Nagraj succeeded in his task, but upon confrontation with Gorakhnath and his mystic black mongoose shikangi, was defeated. Gorakhnath read his mind and discovered that Professor Nagmani had implanted a mind-control device in the form of a capsule in Nagraj's head, to keep him under his control. Gorakhnath operated and removed the capsule from Nagraj's head, setting Nagraj free of Professor Nagmani's control. Nagraj then became Baba Goraknath's disciple and vowed to eliminate crime and terror from the Earth. Since then, Nagraj has toured the world and defeated many villains and terrorists such as Bulldog, Gangster William, Seaman, General Tamta, Shankar Shahnshah.

Nagraj lives as Raj (After Nagraj Ke Baad, he is under the disguise of Nagraj Shah) in a fictional Metropolitan City Mahanagar as an employee of a TV channel that he owns secretly.

Nagraj Parallel Series 

These days Raj Comics have published four parallel series of Nagraj, where each Nagraj is involved in a different universe. There are the following four parallel Nagraj series:

 Nagraj – This is the early Nagraj, this Nagraj introduced in first comic of nagraj, Nagraj has continued in Nag Pralay comic after Visharpi ki Shadi. 
Vishwarakshak Nagraj – The ongoing series of Nagraj, which is being illustrated and written by Anupam Sinha. This version of Nagraj is now called as Vishwarakshak Nagraj.
 Aatankharta Nagraj – This Nagraj appears in the World Terrorism series. This version of Nagraj was introduced with the comics 'Hari Maut' SPCL #2281 which was released on 5 September 2007. This is another timeline of Nagraj which separated from Vishwarakshak Nagraj after the comics 'Visarpi Ki Shadi' SPCL #42. In this timeline, Nagraj does not move to Mahanagar but continues on the mission to eliminate world terrorism. This series, until now, has not portrayed villains with supernatural powers, but are more like gangsters or dons of different countries/cities. It is illustrated by Mr. Hemant and written by Nitin Mishra.
 Narak Nashak Nagraj – This Nagraj is a bit different from the original Nagraj in appearance. He was introduced in the comics 'Hallabol' SPCL #2396. He wears a jacket and a trouser and has longer hair. He also possesses different powers (Sheetika, Takshika, and Agnika) than the original Nagraj. He also rides on a flying snake named Sarpat. Until now, the series has shown him fighting vampires, demons, zombies, etc. It was illustrated by Hemant and written by Nitin Mishra.

Powers and abilities 

Ever since Writer & Artist Anupam Sinha took over the character of Nagraj, his powers and abilities have evolved a great deal making him powerful enough to counter any character of the comic universe.
Nagraj is arguably the most powerful superhero in the Raj Comics Universe and is among the most powerful Icchadhari Naagas of his time. Time and again, he has even shown the potential of challenging the Supreme Snake-Gods like Sheshnaag, Vasuki, Takshak, Kaaljayi, and has defeated the likes of Kaaldoot, Trifana, Mahavyaal and Sheetnaag Kumar, who are ranked among the mightiest snakes in their species.

Microscopic snakes: Nagraj uses them variably as ropes, ladders, parachutes, shields, boats, spies and messengers. Most notable among them is Naganand, at a time considered right-hand man of Nagraj, he left Nagraj's body to look after the people of Nagdweep at Nagraj's order after he upgraded to become an ichchhadhaari nag. Some of the notable snakes possessed by Nagraj are Jagmag sarp, Naav-sarp, Nagfani sarp, Ichchhadhaari-naags, Dhwansak sarp, Tishk sarp
Ichchhadhaari nags. It is quite notable that some of them possess such great powers which rival Nagraj's own, but they all hold great respect for Nagraj. While some of them live in his body just cause they have no better place to live, others live willingly to learn something from Nagraj's way of life. Most notable names among them are:
Saudaangi: She is the member of an Egyptian clan of snakes which fights against the evil mummy of pharaoh Tutankhemun. Like Nagfani snakes she too has spikes on her body when she is in her snake form, she also has a limited knowledge of Tantra.
Sheetnag kumar: He belongs to a clan of ichchhadhari nags living on the Himayalas. He can create and manipulate ice at his will giving it different forms like spears and arrows. Sheetnag-kumar also regulates Nagraj's body temperature making him immune to normal fire when he is inside his body and also giving him protection against severe cold; one of Nagraj's greatest weakness which makes him drowsy pushing him towards hibernation . Sheetnag-kumar's Fang can absorb many attacks and revert them back towards the enemy. He can also freeze all the liquids inside one's body paralysing him.
Naagu: Naagu is the most cheerful and comical among Nagraj's snakes. His acts are such that at times it becomes difficult to judge whether he is a jester or a helper. He belongs to a family of Ichchhadhaari naags living near Mahanagar.
 Venom: Nagraj's venom is the most powerful venom of the world, so much so that direct contact with it results in instant death and melting of body. He gained his venom through the blessings of snake deity Deva Kaaljayi, who himself was blessed by Lord Shiva. It is explained that Lord Shiva who holds the strongest venom of the universe synthesised during Samudra-Manthan, gave a minor portion of it to Deva Kaljayi who holds a dilute form of it and Nagraj holds an even more dilute form of it. The different ways in which Nagraj uses his venom also results in various powers he is said to possess. Like Vish-funkar, Nagraj uses his breath to force out his venom in vapour form, depending upon its concentration the vish-funkar can cause a variety of damages to his enemies. Its effects include temporary blindness, drowsiness, black outs, deaths and for once it even caused fire.
 Ichchhadhaari Shakti: Nagraj even when limited on power has been seen successfully switching between his real and snake form. He can use this power to divide his body into particles and rejoin them within 3 seconds making him invisible and intangible temporarily. 
 Hypnotism: Nagraj has a unique hypnotic effect, formerly considered a separate power, this power was later explained as an application of his ichchhadhaari shakti. Utilizing this power Nagraj can cast a hypnotic reality upon his surroundings using his eyes.[1] Breaking this hypnotic fate is extremely difficult and going against it is impossible. Nagraj and his snakes can cast normal hypnotism too.
 Body-fusions: Nagraj at times has used this power to fuse with his allies to bring down a powerful enemy. He can perform two types of fusions :
 Multi-membered imperfect fusion: In this type of fusion many people can join to form a single body having many heads and hands. Every individual retains his or her own identity and set of powers. Nagraj used it for the first time fusing with the legendary five in order to fight against a creature created by Nagina.
Two-membered perfect fusion: In this type of fusion Nagraj can join with a single person to form a whole new identity. The new identity has new set of powers born from the combination of the participants' sets of powers. Nagraj displayed this power for the first time fusing with Lava to become Agni-Nagraj (Fire-Nagraj). The newborn identity could release 'burning snakes' and could breathe 'venomous fire'.
 Psychic powers: In addition to his ability to communicate with snakes, Nagraj contacted Super Commando Dhruva telepathically when he was trapped in a parallel dimension containing evil souls.

Known relatives and close friends 
Nagraj, along with his deeds, has earned a large amount of friends, many of whom appeared just once, but some that appeared more often, and still fewer that became permanent figures in Nagraj's stories. Here is a list of some very well known characters in his comics :
 King Takshakraj: father (deceased)
 Queen Lalita: mother (deceased)
 Baba Gorakhnath: Mentor
 Mahatma Kaaldoot: Mentor
 Dada Vedacharya: Mentor
 Deva Kaaljayi: Snake Deity
 Nagpasha: Uncle (Arch-enemy)
 Bharti/Faceless: Friend, business partner. She is in one-sided love with Nagraj. She fights with the identity of Faceless.
 Visarpi: Queen of Nagdweep, love interest of Nagraj.
 Vishaank: Crown prince of Nagdweep, younger brother of Visarpi and son of Nagpasha born out of Gurudev's science. Takes secret identity of Chhota Nagraj.
 Sillu: Teenager computer genius, assists Nagraj with tech issues. He's a confidant of Vishaank and crime fighting partner going by Cybro.
 Flemina: Alter ego of Shama, a friend of Vishaank. Becomes legal counsel for Nagraj in future.
 Nagrani: Mother to Nagraj's son Nageesh in a parallel dimension. She is the female equivalent of Nagraj.
 Nageesh: Son that lives with mother Nagrani in a parallel dimension
 Super Commando Dhruva: Best Friend and an ally superhero
 Saudangi: An Egyptian snake-woman with tantrik powers and thorns on her body that lives in his body. Later on it was known that Saudangi was an Egyptian princess and Nagraj was a soldier in their previous birth.
 Sheetnag Kumar: Friend that lives in his body, Prince of snow snakes "Sheetnaag".
 Panch naag: Naagdev, Sarpraj, Naagpreti, Singhnaag and Nagarjuna. They are Ichchhadhari naags (shape shifting snakes) from Naagdweep.
 Naagu: Friend that lives in his body. Very fond of watching movies.
 Professor Srikant/Adrishya Hatyara (Invisible killer): With a situationally-driven personality.

Enemies 
Innumerable enemies of Nagraj have appeared in Nagraj's comics; many died, but some lived on to appear again. Here is the list of Nagraj's major enemies that are still alive and who can be expected to make a comeback in future issues:
 Professor Nagmani: Nagraj's so-called creator who brought up Nagraj.
 Thodanga: A strange African creature. He has a combined body of human, turtle, and rhinoceros.
 Nagdant: A jealous, comparatively weaker copy of Nagraj made by Professor Nagmani.
 Tutan Khamen: Ancient Egyptian mummy whose main power-source, his mask, was snatched away by Nagraj.
 Miss Killer: Beautiful, young, evil scientist from Japan.
 Nagina: A female tantrik and shape-shifting snake.
 Vishandhar: A male tantrik and shape-shifting snake.
 Jaadugar Shakura: An evil sorcerer from an alien planet of immortal wizard dwarfs.
 Nagpasha: Nagraj's immortal venomous uncle who murdered his parents.
 Gurudev: Nagpasha's guru, a man good with mechanical science but evil on intentions who wishes to rule the world though Nagpasha.
 Kentuki: A student of Gurudev, who is a physically powerful snake having the strength of fifty elephants.
 Polka: A terrorist and scientist who works for Nagpasha.
 Zulu: An African exorcist and scientist. An expert of Voodoo and Zombies.
 See-Through: An invisible soul that stole a big share of Nagraj's shape-shifting power, but still wants more.
 Sapera: A man whose power is Nagraj's weakness, i.e. snake charming music.
 Karanvashi: A magician who uses hypnotism to enslave people.
 Vish-Amrit: Duo of Paranatural powers troubling innocents on Earth while playing hide and seek.
 Khalnayak Nagraj: Evil side of Nagraj's personality which still exists in his unconscious mind.
 Tantrata: Bharti's nanaji (maternal grandfather) who took over Bharti's brother Agraj's body and wants to rule the world.
 Garalgant: A famous enemy of Dev Kaljayi but also become enemy of Nagraj.

Comics list

Vishwarakshak Nagraj

World Terrorism Series 
 A new series named "Aatankharta Nagraj" or "Nagraj-World Terrorism Series" is being published parallel to the "Nagayana" series. In this series, Nagraj is travelling around the world to fight and eliminate terrorism. 
"World Terrorism Series" is being written by Mr. Nitin Mishra.

Narak Nashak Nagraj

Raj Comics By Sanjay Gupta 
In October 2020, Raj Comics had a split and got divided into two different entities. One being  Raj Comics By Sanjay Gupta and other being Raj Comics By Manoj Gupta.

Under RCBSG, a new title launched that chronicles Nagraj's journey immediately after the events of  GENL #33 "Nagraj Aur Shango". The first instalment of the series Naag Pralay was released in July 2021.

The first five issues of Nagraj Series viz. (Nagraj, Nagraj Ki Kabra, Nagraj Ka Badla, Nagraj Ki Hongkong Yatra, Nagraj Aur Shango) were rebranded as Nagraj Yugarambh.

Amazing friends of Nagraj

Nagayana 
It was first intended to be a four-part mini-series, but later, the series was extended to include more issues. It's a story based on a hypothetical future world casting Nagraj and Super Commando Dhruva 25 years into the future. Largely based on Hindu epic Ramayana, the story narrowly follows the same storyline as of the epic, but with Raj Comics characters filling in the places of original characters. The reason for the extension of the mini-series was to tell various sub-plots and the series was finally declared to be an eight-part series. The last part is Iti Kaand, which is a 128-page issue released on 10 March 2009. The new series is as follows:

Sarvanayak Series
 One of the most ambitious series by Raj Comics which is trying to bring almost all the characters by Raj Comics in a single narrative.  

Sarvanayak series is complemented by another ongoing series 'Sarvnayak Vistar' which also features Vishwarakshak Nagraj. The comics in Sarvanayak Vistar series are as follows -

Special Comics 
A free special comics of Nagraj under the title ' Nagraj Strikes: The Attack of Coronaman' with serial no. #Covid-19 was launched on Facebook page to raise awareness about the ongoing pandemic of COVID-19. The comics had art by Aswin Amarnath R and story by Manoj Gupta and Ayush Gupta.

Alternate media 

Numerous attempts have been made by Raj Comics to expand Nagraj into other media. However most attempts have been unfruitful.
In the late 1990s, Raj Comics tried adapting Nagraj into a live-action television show in India. A few episodes were shot. However, the show never made it to the television screen. The reason cited was the poor quality of the special effects. Raj Comics was not satisfied with the quality of the show. The production of more episodes was placed on indefinite hiatus. The three episodes that were made are available on CDs, which were distributed freely as an attachment to digest-sized comic editions. (Khalnayak Nagraj, Samraat, and Saudangi).

Nagraj was also set to feature in a proposed animated television series. Once again the show never made it to the television screen. An episodic series was in works, and a teaser was uploaded on YouTube featuring Nagraj and his arch enemy Jadugar Shakoora. However, since then there has been no news about the series. It is assumed that production has stopped because the production company Rtoonz's website has since disappeared.

In November 2007, an agreement was signed between Motion Picture Corporation and Raj Comics to produce a high quality 2D Movie featuring Nagraj.

Also in 2011, 2012, 2013, 2017, and 2021, five animated films based on Nagraj were released. They were written by the RSS Brothers and directed by Shashikanth Ramawat. Three of the films finally aired on Cartoon Network India in 2015 while the last two aired on that channel in 2019 and 2021. The films' names were My Name is Raj: Raj aur Asudama Ki Ladal, My Name is Raj: Raj Ki Nayi Chunatiyaan, My Name is Raj: Attack of the Demons, My Name is Raj: Vizukama Ki Tazar, and My Name is Raj: Return of Zohak. In all of the films, Shekar Ramwat starred as Raj.

It was, however, reported in 2019, that Indian actor Ranveer Singh could play Nagraj, in a film produced by Karan Johar. Raj Comics president Manoj Gupta also expressed his happiness on the same.

In February 2020 Bhojpuri star Yash announced on his birthday that he will make movie on issue no.71 Nagraj Aur vishkanya Starring Yash as nagraj while Nidhi raj will play Vishkanya as main antagonist. Its first look was shared on web platform gaining positive feedback.

References

Further reading

External links 
comicvine
Neeshu comics
Classic Nagraj : The Hero, Fans Desperately needs Back. CulturePOPcorn.

Comic martial artists
Comics characters introduced in 1986
Comics characters who can move at superhuman speeds
Comics characters with accelerated healing
Comics characters with superhuman senses
Comics characters with superhuman strength
Fictional hypnotists and indoctrinators
Fictional telepaths
Fictional therianthropes
Raj Comics superheroes
Shapeshifter characters in comics
Snakes in popular culture